Manganese pentacarbonyl bromide is an organomanganese compound with the formula BrMn(CO)5.  It is a bright orange solid that is a precursor to other manganese complexes.  The compound is prepared by treatment of dimanganese decacarbonyl with bromine:
Mn2(CO)10  +  Br2   →   2 BrMn(CO)5

The complex undergoes substitution by a variety of donor ligands (L), e.g. to give derivatives of the type BrMn(CO)3L2.

The complex adopts an octahedral coordination geometry.

References

Carbonyl complexes
Organomanganese compounds